The Chicopee-class oilers were oilers operated by the United States Navy during World War II. There were two ships of the class, and both survived the war.

Description
The class consisted of two petroleum tankers that had been ordered by Standard Oil Company of New Jersey and were acquired by the U.S. Navy in early 1942. , the former Esso Trenton, was acquired by the U.S. Navy shortly after launching, while , the former Esso Albany, was acquired after making two voyages for Standard Oil.

Operational history
The Chicopee oilers both operated in the Atlantic and Mediterranean areas from commissioning through late 1944, when they both were assigned to the Pacific theater.

Both ships were returned to Standard Oil at decommissioning, and both were later converted to container ships. The extant portions of the hull of the ex-Chicopee, were scrapped in 1963, while the ex-Housatonic was scrapped some time after 1989.

References

Auxiliary replenishment ship classes
Auxiliary ship classes of the United States Navy
 
 
Auxiliary transport ship classes